Steven Fogarty (born April 19, 1993) is an American professional ice hockey forward currently playing for the Iowa Wild of the American Hockey League (AHL) while under contract to the Minnesota Wild of the National Hockey League (NHL). Fogarty was drafted by the New York Rangers in the 3rd round of the 2011 NHL Entry Draft.

Playing career
Fogarty was born in Chambersburg, Pennsylvania but moved with his family to Egypt and then Marlton, New Jersey before finally settling in Minnesota where he grew up playing junior hockey. He played college hockey for the University of Notre Dame from 2012 to 2016 and served as the captain for the Notre Dame Fighting Irish hockey team his junior and senior years. On March 29, 2016, Fogarty embarked on his professional career by signing a two-year, entry-level contract with the New York Rangers. He was assigned to complete the 2015–16 season with AHL affiliate, the Hartford Wolf Pack.

Fogarty made his National Hockey League debut for the Rangers in the final game of the 2017–18 season, going scoreless with 2 penalty minutes during the game before being returned to Hartford to finish the season.

As a free agent from the Rangers, Fogarty left to sign a one-year, two-way contract with the Buffalo Sabres on October 19, 2020. On March 31, 2021, Fogarty scored his first career NHL goal against the Philadelphia Flyers. He finished his lone season with the Sabres, registering 1 goal and 3 points through 9 games.

As a free agent for the second consecutive season, Fogarty was signed to a one-year, two-way contract with the Boston Bruins on July 28, 2021.

On July 13, 2022, Fogarty joined his fourth NHL organization after signing a two-year, two-way contract with the Minnesota Wild.

Career statistics

Awards and honors

References

External links

1993 births
Living people
American men's ice hockey centers
Boston Bruins players
Buffalo Sabres players
Chicago Steel players
Sportspeople from Edina, Minnesota
Edina High School alumni
Hartford Wolf Pack players
Ice hockey players from Minnesota
Iowa Wild players
Minnesota Wild players
New York Rangers draft picks
New York Rangers players
Notre Dame Fighting Irish men's ice hockey players
Penticton Vees players
People from Chambersburg, Pennsylvania
Providence Bruins players
Rochester Americans players